Wilson Junior High School is a historic junior high school located at Muncie, Delaware County, Indiana, United States. It was built in 1921, and is a three-story, "U"-shaped, Classical Revival style brick veneer building with a flat roof. Additions were made to the original building in 1927, 1954, and 1964. The building features ornamental brickwork.

It was added to the National Register of Historic Places in 2001.

References

School buildings on the National Register of Historic Places in Indiana
Neoclassical architecture in Indiana
School buildings completed in 1921
Buildings and structures in Muncie, Indiana
National Register of Historic Places in Muncie, Indiana
1921 establishments in Indiana